Streptomyces stramineus is a bacterium species from the genus of Streptomyces which has been isolated from soil from grassland in the USA. Streptomyces stramineus produces phleomycin.

See also 
 List of Streptomyces species

References

Further reading

External links
Type strain of Streptomyces stramineus at BacDive -  the Bacterial Diversity Metadatabase	

stramineus
Bacteria described in 1997